Gareth Hal Shute (born 1 September 1973) is a non-fiction author, musician and journalist from New Zealand.

Career

Shute's first book, Hip Hop Music In Aotearoa was published in 2004, and won an award at the NZ book awards in 2005.  He went on to write four more books: Making Music In New Zealand, Insights: New Zealand Artists Talk About Creativity, NZ Rock: 1987-2007 and Concept Albums.

Shute has also been a music columnist for New Zealand Music Magazine and continues to write for the music history website, Audioculture. 

Over this time, he was also a member of a number of local bands including: The Tokey Tones, The Ruby Suns, The Brunettes, The Cosbys, The Conjurors, Dictaphone Blues, and The Broken Heartbreakers. He currently plays in garage rock two-piece Fever Party and all-star quartet Thee Golden Geese

References 

1973 births
Living people
New Zealand journalists